Requiem for a Dream is a 1978 novel by American writer Hubert Selby Jr., that concerns four New Yorkers whose lives spiral out of control as they succumb to their addictions.

Plot
This story follows the lives of Sara Goldfarb, her son Harry, his girlfriend Marion Silver, and his best friend Tyrone C. Love, who are all searching for the key to their dreams in their own ways. In the process, they fall into devastating lives of addiction. Harry and Marion are in love and want to open their own business; their friend Tyrone wants to escape life in the ghetto. To achieve these dreams, they buy a large amount of heroin, planning to get rich by selling it.

Sara, Harry's lonely widowed mother, dreams of being on television. When a phone call from a game show casting company gets her hopes up, she goes to a doctor, who gives her diet pills to lose weight. She spends the next few months on the pills, wanting desperately to look thin on TV and fit into a red dress from her younger days. However, the casting company does not notify her about the details of her show. She becomes addicted to the diet pills and eventually develops amphetamine psychosis after her life continues to go downhill. She eventually ends up in a mental institution, where she undergoes electroconvulsive therapy (ECT).

Harry, Marion, and Tyrone become addicted to their own product. Eventually, when heroin becomes scarce, they turn on each other, slowly hiding the drugs they obtain from the other two members. On their way to Miami, Harry and Tyrone are arrested, convicted, and sentenced to jail. Harry's arm has become infected from repeated injections, and has to be amputated. Left alone, Marion becomes a prostitute to support her addiction. In jail, Tyrone faces frequent abuse from the guards due to his race.

Film adaptation

The novel was later adapted into a critically acclaimed eponymous film, released in 2000. The film was directed by Darren Aronofsky and stars Jared Leto, Jennifer Connelly, Marlon Wayans and Ellen Burstyn. Burstyn was nominated for the Academy Award for Best Actress for her performance as Sara.

References

Release details
 Paperback – , published in 2000 by Da Capo Press.

1978 American novels
American novels adapted into films
Novels by Hubert Selby Jr.
Novels set in New York City
Novels about drugs
Playboy Press books
English-language novels
Novels about substance abuse
Novels about heroin addiction
Requiem for a Dream